NCT Life is a series of Korean variety show featuring South Korean boy band NCT. Currently, it spans eleven different seasons. The title of the show is a portmanteau that combines "NCT Lifestyle" and "City Life".

Synopsis
Members of the group show off their daily lives, letting audiences see into NCT's promotional activities while traveling.

Cast
1st season: Taeil, Hansol, Johnny, Taeyong, Yuta, Doyoung, Ten, Jaehyun, Mark Lee, Jeno, Haechan, Jaemin, Jisung
2nd season: Taeyong, Yuta, Kun, Doyoung, Jaehyun, Winwin
3rd season: Taeil, Taeyong, Yuta, Jaehyun, Winwin, Mark, Haechan
4th season: Taeil, Taeyong, Yuta, Doyoung, Ten, Jaehyun, Winwin
5th season: Jeno, Renjun, Jisung, Chenle
6th season: Johnny, Taeyong, Doyoung, Ten, Jaehyun
7th season: Taeil, Taeyong, Doyoung, Winwin, Yuta
8th season: Johnny, Yuta, Kun, Winwin, Lucas, Mark
9th season: Taeil, Johnny, Yuta, Doyoung, Jaehyun, Haechan
10th season: Renjun, Jeno, Jaemin, Chenle, Jisung
11th season: Taeil, Johnny, Taeyong, Yuta, Doyoung, Jaehyun, Jungwoo, Mark, Haechan

Season

Broadcasting platforms

Korea 
Naver TV Cast
V Live
MBC Music (Season 1-3)
KBS Joy (Season 7)
Oksusu
seezn

China 
Youku
Tudou
Ali Music

Thailand 
True4U
LINE TV

Taiwan 
MTV

References

External links

Television series based on singers and musicians
NCT (band)
Television series by SM C&C